The Rer Bare (or Rerebere, Rer Shabelle) are a tribe in Ethiopia's eastern Ogaden region on the Shabele River, near Somalia, who currently speak Somali. They appear to have shifted to Somali from a now-extinct language.

Language and origins 
Their unattested but apparently non-Somali language seems to have been first mentioned in print by Lionel Bender in 1975:

Others have linked the Rer Bare to the Bantu language family, implying that they may be the remnants of a Bantu-speaking pre-Somali population or, like the "Somali Bantu" in the Jubba River valley of southern Somalia, the descendants of Bantu slaves imported from other parts of East Africa in the 19th century. Tobias Hagmann refers to them as "Somalised Bantu". According to Ulrich Braukämper:

A British hunter, Colonel Swayne, who visited Imi in February 1893, relates that he was the guest of Gabba Oboho, a chief of the Adona, for several days.

Notes

Bibliography
 Bender, M. L. The Ethiopian Nilo-Saharans.  Artistic Printers, Addis Ababa 1975.

External links
 Ahmed Yusuf Farah, United Nations Development Programme: Permanent Agricultural Settlements Along The Webi Shabelle River In Gode Zone Of The Ethiopian Somali National Regional State (1995) (PDF)

Ethnic groups in Ethiopia
Unattested languages of Africa